Jean Fievez  (born 30 November 1910 – 18 March 1997) was a Belgian footballer. He was born in Brussels.

Early career
He started his career at RCS La Forestoise before joining White Star de Bruxelles in 1936. playing as a striker, he played nine times, and scored four goals for Belgium. From 1946–1947, he played for RAEC Mons who then played in Division 3.

Honours 
 Belgian international from 1936 to 1939 (9 caps and 4 goals)
 First international match: 3 May 1936, Belgium-Netherlands, 1–1 (friendly)
 Picked for the 1938 World Cup (did not play)

References 

Belgium international footballers
Belgian footballers
1938 FIFA World Cup players
R.A.E.C. Mons players
1910 births
1997 deaths
Footballers from Brussels
Léopold FC players
Association football forwards